Nicoletta Grisoni, longer name Nicole Fernande Grisoni-Chappuis, better known by her mononym Nicoletta (born 11 April 1944 in Vongy, now known as Thonon-les-Bains, Haute-Savoie, France) is a French pop singer. Becoming very popular on French radio and television, where she had a number of hits in the 1960s and the 1970s, she was considered as part of what is known as the French yé-yé generation heavily influenced by American music, particularly Rhythm and blues, Rock and roll and Beat music. She is mostly known for her version of "Mamy Blue".

Career
Nicoletta Grisoni was reportedly born of a mentally retarded woman who got pregnant as a result of rape. She reportedly chose the song "Mamy Blue" as a tribute to her mother. The original of the song was that of Spanish band Los Pop-Tops and had been subject of many interpretations.

She began her music as a member of her local church choir. She worked for a while in a laundry and at a medical clinic in addition to DJ-ing in the beginning 1960s developing contacts. Encouraged by French songwriter Léo Missir, she was signed to Barclay. Her initial hits included "L'Homme à la moto" (an earlier Edith Piaf song), "Pour oublier qu'on s'est aimé" (from Nino Ferrer, and "Encore un jour sans toi" (co-written by Guy Marchand and Léo Missir).

1967 saw the release of "La Musique" (adaptation from Ann Grégory), and "Il est mort le soleil", written by Pierre Delanoë and music by Hubert Giraud. The song was adapted and interpreted later on by Ray Charles under the title "The Sun Died", also covered by Tom Jones. As activist, she campaigned against play-back music insisting to sing live in her appearances on television. She also supported the French general strike in May 1968, singing in its support.

In 1971, she recorded a French version of "Mamy Blue", a gospel song composed by Hubert Giraud with massive success. It was a hit in many countries outside France as well. In 1973, she founded her own record label, "Rapa Nui", for producing and launching new talents. The same year she released "Fio Maravilla", another big hit for her. The origin was a Brazilian hit from Jorge Ben Jor about soccer player Fio Maravilha, adapted to French by lyricist Boris Bergman. In 1976, her French version of The Battle Hymn of the Republic, titled "Glory Alleluia" with new French lyrics and arrangement by André Pascal, became a Christmas hit.

After a hiatus because of her marriage and bearing a child, she returned to music in 1983 with "Idées noires", as a duo with Bernard Lavilliers. In 1987, she took part in the opera Grandeur et décadence de la ville de Mahagonny (a French version of Rise and Fall of the City of Mahagonny by Kurt Weill and Bertolt Brecht), playing the role of Jenny in the opera. The same year, she also took role of Esméralda in the musical comedy Quasimodo based on Victor Hugo's The Hunchback of Notre-Dame composed by William Sheller.

In the beginning of the 1990s, she suffered great financial problems despite releasing quality interpretations with collaborations from William Sheller, Richard Cocciante, Pierre Delanoë and taking part in galas.

In 2006, Nicoletta released a jazz album Le Rendez-vous on Universal Classics label containing her interpretations of classics including "Summertime", "Georgia on My Mind", "Bei mir bist du schön" and some original materials written by Bernard Lavilliers, Patrick Eudeline and Manu Chao. Nicoletta enjoyed critical acclaim and following remaining an integral part of French music culture. She became an officer of Ordre des Arts et des Lettres in 2010 in recognition of her musical output.

In 2011, she collaborated with Didier Morville known as Joeystarr, the former vocalist of Suprême NTM in a new revamped rap version of her hit "Mamy Blue" named "Mamy" with altogether new lyrics. "Mamy" heavily samples on the track, mainly that of Nicoletta' s 1971 interpretation. The track appeared on the rapper's album titled Egomaniac and in September 2012, she gave a concert accompanied by 400 choir members from Saint Gervais, near Bordeaux.

Personal life
In 1978, she married Patrick Chappuis, a Swiss jeweler and had a son Alexandre the following year. The couple divorced in 1985, after 7 years of marriage. In the beginning of the 1990s, she suffered great financial problems. In 1992, she lost her grandmother and became interested in religion for a while. She recorded religious materials and a notable collaboration with a gospel choir from the Antilles. She also gave charity concerts in support of Third World developing countries.

Discography

Albums 
1967: Il est mort le soleil
1969: Olympia
1970: Ma vie c'est un manège
1971: Visage
1973: Nicoletta 73
1973: Viens te baladeh au creux de mes chansons
1975: Sur les bords de la tendresse
1976: L'amour violet
1978: Palace
1980: Naturel... ma belle!
1982: Qu'est-ce qui m'arrive?
1987: Vivre aujourd'hui
1995: J'attends, j'apprends
1996: The Gospel Voices
1998: Connivences
2006: Le rendez-vous

Singles

1967: La musique
1967: Il est mort le soleil
1969: Ma vie c’est un manège
1971: "Mammy Blue"
1973: Fio Maravilla
1974: Glory Alleluia
1975: À quoi sert de vivre libre ?

Bibliography
45 Tours et puis s'en va
La Maison d'en face (éd. Florent Massot) (an autobiography)

References

External links
Official website

1944 births
Living people
People from Thonon-les-Bains
French women singers
French people of Italian descent
Pathé-Marconi artists